The first full season of the International Fight League (IFL) was composed of 11 events (9 normal events, 1 semi-final event and 1 final championship event). Over the span of nine events each of the 12 IFL teams competed in 3 events each and the top four teams with the best records advanced to the semi final event. After the semi final event the top two teams met in the Championship event which took place at the Los Angeles Forum. Each of the first 9 events also included at least one superfight. {www.ifl.tv}

1 Originally Ivan Salaverry was supposed to partake in the superfight but along with an IFL agreement he had a contract with the now defunct WFA. After the UFC bought out the WFA Salaverry's contract was put up into limbo preventing him from participating in the superfight.

2 Originally the superfight was to be between IFL coaches Maurice Smith and Marco Ruas but during training Ruas injured himself cancelling this fight. It has now been rescheduled for the May 19th show.

References

Additional references
 Hunt, Loretta. Introducing the International Fight League. IFC.TV. January 9, 2006. Retrieved May 6, 2006.
Thaler, Jeff. Breaking Down the Match-Up: UFC vs. IFL. Sherdog.com. March 2, 2006. Retrieved May 6, 2006.

External links
IFL – Official Website

International Fight League
International Fight League, 2007
Mixed martial arts in the United States
Events in Hoffman Estates, Illinois
Events in Moline, Illinois
Events in Duluth, Georgia
Events in Houston
Events in Inglewood, California
Events in Uncasville, Connecticut